Events from the year 1713 in Ireland.

Incumbent
Monarch: Anne

Events
November–December – Parliament of Ireland meets and is prorogued without voting supply beyond the end of the year.
 Dublin election riot - A riot broke out in Dublin during the contested election of the Dublin City constituency by the Whigs and Tories.

Births
 November 24 – Laurence Sterne, Irish-born English novelist (d. 1768, England)

Deaths
January 2 – Lady Mary Butler, younger daughter of 2nd Duke of Ormonde and Jonathan Swift’s "greatest favourite" (b. 1689)

References